Glen Massie (born 13 January 1958) is a Republican Iowa State Representative from the 74th District.

Endorsements
In 2011, he endorsed Republican presidential candidate Ron Paul.

References

Living people
Republican Party members of the Iowa House of Representatives
1958 births
Place of birth missing (living people)